Dalsland is a Swedish traditional province, or landskap, situated in Götaland in southern Sweden. Lying to the west of Lake Vänern, it is bordered by Värmland to the north, Västergötland to the southeast, Bohuslän to the west, and Norway to the northwest.

The province has a low population density of around 14 inhabitants/km2 and just one town of significant size: Åmål. The total population numbers 50,604. The uninhabited areas are characterized by dense forests in the northwestern uplands and lakes in the east, giving rise to the epithet, commonly used for Dalsland, of "Sweden's lake province".

The Latinized name Dalia, which was often used to name Dalsland in older prints, can still sometimes be encountered.

Administration 
The traditional provinces of Sweden serve no administrative or political purposes, but are historical and cultural entities. Dalsland formed the northern part of the administrative county Älvsborg County until 1998 when the present Västra Götaland County was formed. A very small part of the province, Dalboredden, is in Värmland County.

Heraldry 
Dalsland was granted its arms at the time of the funeral of Gustav Vasa in 1560. In the 16th century Dalsland had the status of a County (Comitatus) and was represented with an Earl's coronet. On January 18, 1884 the  Privy Council gave all provinces the right of use to a Dukal coronet for their coat of arms. Blazon:  "Argent an Ox passant armed and hoofed Or."

Etymology 
Dalsland was originally called Dal, "Valley", originally referring only to the flat southeastern part. The name Dal is still in part used locally, about all Dalsland. The name Dalsland, "valley land", might have been given by central authorities, to distinguish from Dalarna.

Geography 

No other part of Sweden has its area covered with as many lakes as Dalsland does.

From the shores of Vänern, one can sail through the river systems up to the mythical lake Stora Le.

The terrain consists of 1/4 agricultural lands and 2/3 forested lands. The province's southern part are suitable for agriculture, but there is a shortage of man-power to cultivate it.

Tresticklan is a national park in Dalsland. There are also several nature reserves.

Sub-divisions 
Municipalities are local districts of administration, with elected councils.
Within Dalsland's borders these are the municipalities:

 Bengtsfors Municipality
 Dals-Ed Municipality
 Färgelanda Municipality
 Mellerud Municipality
 Åmål Municipality
 Parts of Munkedal, Säffle, Vänersborg and Årjäng Municipalities, although all municipal seats of these four are outside Dalsland's borders.

Dalsland was historically divided into one chartered city and five hundreds. The hundreds were  provincial sub-divisions from the Middle Ages, but were discontinued in the early 20th century.

Dalsland's chartered city was Åmål (royal charter in 1643). Its hundreds were: Nordal Hundred, Sundal Hundred, Tössbo Hundred, Valbo Hundred and Vedbo Hundred. They correspond approximately to today's municipalities: Nordal → Mellerud, Sundal → part of Vänersborg, Tössbo+Åmål → Åmål, Valbo → Färgelanda and Vedbo → Bengtsfors+Dals-Ed.

Elections 
Dalsland is part of Västra Götaland County and does not have its own assembly. However, these are combined results from the five municipalities whose seats are in the province in Riksdag elections since the 1973 election, the first since the municipal merger.

Riksdag

History 
The original name of Dalsland was "Dal" – "Dalsland" was not used until the 19th century. Dal literally means "Valley".

The area has around 5,000 localized ancient remains. They indicate the origin of the inhabitants to stem from the south and the province Bohuslän; dialectal studies and social aspects have come to a similar conclusion. [1]

Since ancient times the description "Lives on Dal" has been the description used by the inhabitants themselves to describe where they live, instead of the usual "lives in ...". Speculation has it, this is due to the remote and isolated location of the province. [1]

In the 13th century the inhabitants were referred to as "The West gothics west of lake Vänern" by King Magnus Ladulås. A provincial law of 1442 called them "The West Gothics of Dal". All sources point to them being a – remote – part of the Västergötland (West Gothia) province.

Its exposed location near the Norwegian border made it subject to invasion, although to a lesser degree than the southern Bohuslän and Västergötland. It was first conquered around 1100 by the Norwegian Magnus Barefoot, who only held until King Valdemar Atterdag re-drew the provincial borders. [1]

The Nordic Seven Years' War was particularly hard, especially 1568 when 281 farms were burnt. Other feuds that were negative for the province were those of 1611-1612, 1644-1645 and 1675–1679.

Culture 
People in the western part of Dalsland were believed to have migrated from Bohuslän, although probably long before that area was Norwegian. A distinctive feature in the Högsäter-area of Valbo Hundred was an inclination to brown eyes and dark hair, and a slightly rounder facial shape. [1]

The municipalities in Dalsland still makes frequent use of the provincial name, as the means to distinguish their history and culture from the rest of West Sweden. Culturally, Dalsland is as connected to Värmland as it is to the other neighbouring provinces Västergötland and Bohuslän.

Tongue 
The dialect is a Swedish language variety known as the Dalbo-dialect. It is a variation of the Götamål dialect, and closest related to the other Götaland provinces, although it differs from them in the absence of a guttural R.

Its location by the Norwegian border has also added some features. The dialects vary over the province, since it is mostly hilly but has some more densely populated areas near its borders. These areas have been influenced by the neighbour areas.

Sports
Football in the province is administered by Dalslands Fotbollförbund.

See also
Egenäs

References 

 From Nordisk familjebok, owl edition; vol. 5; p. 1136 (1906). (link below).
 From Nordisk familjebok, owl edition; vol. 5; p. 1137 (1906).

External links 

 article Dal from Nordisk familjebok, in Swedish only.
 Dalsland -  from West Sweden Tourist Board. In Swedish, English and German.

 
Provinces of Sweden